Bettina Bähr-Losse (born 28 January 1967) is a German lawyer and politician (SPD). From 1 October 2016 until the end of the 2017 legislative period, she was a member of the Bundestag.

Early life and career
Bettina Bähr-Losse was born in Braunschweig, where she obtained her early education at the Jugenddorf-Christophorusschule Braunschweig. She went on to study law at the universities in Regensburg, Göttingen and Bonn. After the legal clerkship in the district of the Higher Regional Court of Cologne she is a lawyer in Sankt Augustin with family law as a focal point of her law practice.

Political career
Bähr-Losse is deputy leader of the SPD parliamentary group in the district council of Rhein-Sieg-Kreis. In the Federal election 2013 she ran in Rhein-Sieg-Kreis II, but won no mandate. Since she was second of the SPD party list in North Rhine-Westphalia for the 18th Bundestag, she replaced Peer Steinbrück on 1 October 2016 in the Bundestag. However, at the federal election 2017 she was again unable to win a mandate.

References

External links
 Bettina Bähr-Losse at the SPD Rhein-Sieg
 Profile of Bettina Bähr-Losse at the NRWSPD

Female members of the Bundestag
Living people
1967 births
Members of the Bundestag for North Rhine-Westphalia
Politicians from Braunschweig
Members of the Bundestag 2013–2017
Members of the Bundestag for the Social Democratic Party of Germany
21st-century German women politicians